Augusto Conti (December 6, 1822 -  March 6, 1905) was an Italian philosopher and academic.

Biography
Augusto Conti was born in San Pietro alle Fonti in San Miniato al Tedesco in 1822 to a family from Livorno. His parents were Natale and Anna Passetti.

He studied in Siena and Pisa; at university he assaulted a professor whom he considered reactionary. He was expelled from the university and spent a few months in prison. After that episode he was forced to complete his studies outside the Grand Duchy of Tuscany. He therefore moved to the Duchy of Lucca and graduated in law at the University of Lucca. He was a standard-bearer in Montanara with the Tuscan volunteers during the First Italian War of Independence. He taught in Lucca, Pisa and in the Higher Institute of Florence. Distinguished Christian philosopher, prestigious writer, pedagogist, he collaborated with Raffaello Lambruschini on the periodical La famiglia e la scuola.

On March 31, 1869, for his literary and scientific merits, he was called to sit in the College of Residents of the Accademia della Crusca; later he covered the Archconsulate several times. He was the philosopher of beauty, who defined being between the true and the good, and connected them as the means between the beginning and the end. He had a classical style and his works are sometimes appreciated more for the elegance of the prose than for the content.

In Florence, he was for a long time high councilor of public education and collaborated with the architect Emilio De Fabris for the decoration of the facade of Santa Maria del Fiore using iconographic symbolism to  represent the greatness of Christianity and the meaning of the Virgin Mary.

Works 
Cose di storia e d'arte (1874)
Evidenza, amore e fede (1887)
I discorsi del tempo in un viaggio in Italia (1867)
Il bello nel vero
Il buono nel vero
Illustrazione delle sculture e dei mosaici sulla facciata del Duomo di Firenze (1887)
Il vero nell'ordine (1876)
L'armonia delle cose
Letteratura e patria, collana di ricordi nazionali
Nuovi discorsi del tempo
Religione ed arte
Storia della filosofia
Sveglie dell'anima
Il Messia redentore vaticinato
La mia corona del rosario
Ai figli del popolo
Giovanni Duprè o Dell'arte
Evidenza, amore e fede o i criteri della filosofia (1858)
La filosofia di Dante
La bellezza qual mezzo potente di educazione

Bibliography
 Giovanni Casati, Dizionario degli scrittori d'Italia dalle origini fino ai viventi, Romolo Ghirlanda Editore, Milano, 1926-1934.
 Mario Themelly, «CONTI, Augusto» in Dizionario Biografico degli Italiani, Volume 28, Roma, Istituto dell'Enciclopedia Italiana, 1983.
 Grande Dizionario Enciclopedico UTET (Fedele), Torino, UTET, 1992, volume V, alla voce.

References

Italian philosophers